The following highways are numbered 992:

United States